James Augustine Power (14 September 1903 – 9 February 1975) was a Liberal party member of the House of Commons of Canada and a lawyer. He was born in St. John's, Newfoundland.

He was first elected at the St. John's West riding in the 1953 general election. After serving his only Parliamentary term, the 22nd Canadian Parliament, he was defeated by William Joseph Browne of the Progressive Conservative party.

He died on 9 February 1975 and was interred at Belvedere Cemetery in St. John's.

References

External links
 

1903 births
1975 deaths
Lawyers in Newfoundland and Labrador
Liberal Party of Canada MPs
Members of the House of Commons of Canada from Newfoundland and Labrador
Politicians from St. John's, Newfoundland and Labrador
20th-century Canadian lawyers